Anonaepestis bengalella (atis borer moth or custard-apple caterpillar) is a species of snout moth in the genus Anonaepestis. It was described by Ragonot in 1894. It is found from India to Java and the Philippines and has also been recorded from Australia and Taiwan.

The larvae feed on Annona squamosa and Annona reticulata. They bore the fruit of their host plant.

References
Ragonot, 1894b:Ragonot E.-L. 1894b. A new enemy of the custard-apple. - Indian Museum Notes 3:106–107. 

Moths described in 1894
Phycitini
Moths of Asia
Moths of Australia
Taxa named by Émile Louis Ragonot